"Waltz #2 (XO)" is a song by American singer-songwriter Elliott Smith. It was released in 1998 by record label DreamWorks as the first single from his fourth studio album, XO.

Release 

The single did not chart in the United States but reached number 52 in the UK Singles Chart, his highest chart placement in the UK to date.

Reception
In its article on the song, Slate called it Elliott Smith's best song.

Pitchfork said, "Inside a smoky karaoke bar, a man and a woman—two people who may very well be stand-ins for Elliott Smith's mother, Bunny, and his stepfather, Charlie—select songs that thinly veil their marital strife. She blankly performs the humiliating "Cathy's Clown", he sings the pointed "You're No Good". Smith uses karaoke night to give us this meta novella about pop music and heartbreak."

Cover versions 
The song was covered by Kiki and Herb in their 2016 cabaret show Kiki & Herb: Seeking Asylum! at Joe's Pub, and by Canadian singer-songwriter Dan Mangan on his 2020 covers album Thief.

Track listing

References 

Elliott Smith songs
1998 singles
DreamWorks Records singles
Song recordings produced by Tom Rothrock
1998 songs
Songs written by Elliott Smith